Lorena Homar López is an SM5 classified Spanish swimmer who has represented Spain at the 2012 Summer Paralympics.

Personal 
When Homar was four years old, both of her legs were amputated because of complications related to getting meningitis.

Swimming 
Homar is an SM5 classified swimmer.  She started swimming when she was four years old.

In 2007, Homar competed at the IDM German Open.  Eindhoven, Netherlands hosted  the 2010 IPC World Swimming Championships at which she competed. Failing to make the finals, she finished tenth in 100  meter breaststroke. In another event at the Worlds, she won a bronze in a 200-meter medley race with a time of 4'13"71. She was one of four Spanish swimmers at the World Championships that were affiliated with CTEIB, an institute created by the Government of the Balearic Islands intended to provide an education to elite high-performance sportspeople. Homar set a minimum Spanish qualifying time for the London Paralympic Games at the  Son Hugo Municipal Swimming Pool in February 2012. She competed at the 2012 Spanish National Championships.  That year, she was coached by Toni Pomar, and trained with Xavi Torres, Esther Morales Fernández and Alejandro Sánchez. She competed at the 2012 Summer Paralympics, and had a seventh-place finish in a 200-meter freestyle race with a time of  4'03"16. In 2013, she competed in the Championship of Spain by Autonomous Open Paralympic Swimming, where she represented the Balearic Islands.

References 

Swimmers at the 2012 Summer Paralympics
Paralympic swimmers of Spain
Living people
Year of birth missing (living people)
Spanish female medley swimmers
Spanish female breaststroke swimmers
S6-classified Paralympic swimmers